Hawkins' School of Performing Arts is the official school of Hawkins Contemporary and Classical Ballet Company, Folsom, California's official ballet school which also offers classes in tap, jazz, hip hop, lyrical, musical theater dance and more.

Hawkins' School of Performing Arts is also home to other companies which includes: Hawkins Contemporary Jazz Company, and Hawkins Tap Company.

Address

118 Woodmere Road Suite 120
Folsom, CA 95630

Important People
 Deirdre Hawkins, Director and Owner, M.A. Education - Dance Specializiation, Stanford University

External links
 Hawkins' School of Performing Arts

References
 SacTicket reviews iMPACT and STAGES

Dance schools in the United States
Dance in California
Folsom, California
Universities and colleges in Sacramento County, California
Education in Sacramento County, California